Lesa Mayes-Stringer (born 13th of May, 1968 in North Battleford, Saskatchewan) is a former bobsled athlete who competed for Canada from 1999 to 2007.  

Lesa Mayes-Stringer married Christopher Stringer in Richmond, British Columbia in 1994. Together she and her husband have 3 children. The oldest is Meigan Stringer, born in 1996 and doing her degree in International Business at Inseec in Lyon, France. Their second child, Madison Stringer, was born May 29th, 1998. She is attending the University of Geneva in Switzerland while doing her Masters in Neuroscience. Adam Stringer was born April 6, 2003. He is attending the University of Alberta in the Faculty of Fine Arts and Design.

Education   

Lesa earned her degree in history from York University on an academic scholarship and completed the PDP program at  Simon Fraser University in British Columbia where she received her teaching certification.

Professional career 

Lesa worked as a High School teacher in Calgary, Alberta. During this time she started the PLP program for High School social studies for the Calgary Board of Education. She used the theory of multiple intelligences as a basis for using diversified teaching techniques to better meet individual student needs. The program began as a pilot program with approximately 24 students and later ballooned to include thousands of students.

Athletic Career 

Canadian Jr. Silver medallist in the Heptathlon

Canadian Silver medallist Canadian Senior Track and Field Championships in the Heptathlon   

York University Track team. CIAU National Gold medallist, 60 meter hurdles; Gold medallist 4X400m; Gold medallist, 4X100m; Bronze medallist shot put

Simon Fraser University Track and Field Team. Gold medallist shot put, Gold medallist 4X100m    

Canadian Champion Women's 2 man Bobsleigh 2003/2005 pilot   

First Black Women's Canadian Bobsleigh Pilot Gold Medallist

First North American Black Women to compete on the World Cup Circuit as a pilot.     

Canadian Champion Women's 2man Bobsleigh 2004/2005 pilot.         

During her time as an athlete Lesa volunteered as a speaker with the YES Program (Youth Education for Sport) speaking to thousands of children throughout Canada. She also represented the 350 Canadian High Performance athletes from 2000 to 2007 on the executive board for the Canadian Sport Institute located in Calgary, Alberta. She advocated for athletes rights and even met with the Minister of Health and helped to get mandatory heath coverage put in place  for all National Team athletes. 

In 2007,  Lesa Mayes-Stringer and her family moved to France. She was asked to rebuild the National Bobsleigh program for Team France with assistance from the head coach of the national team of Monaco.

Lesa Mayes-Stringer started an English training school in France called Lovin'English. Her daughter Madison competes with the French National Women's Bobsleigh Team. In 2021, Madison won the Under 23 Jr World Championships with her pilot Margot Boch.

Lesa now lives in Edmonton, Alberta Canada where she works in the full time ministry as the Women's Ministry Leader for the Capital City Church of Christ. She is involved in helping to bring about changes in Bobsleigh for Canada.   

She is the younger sister of former professional football player Rueben Mayes.

References

 Black pioneers of Western Canada 2005 conference featuring Mayes-Stringer
 Canadian sport news information for the 2003-04 bobsleigh and skeleton team featuring Mayes-Stringer

External links
 

1968 births
Living people
Black Canadian sportswomen
Canadian female bobsledders
Canadian female hurdlers
Canadian heptathletes
French female bobsledders
Sportspeople from North Battleford
York University alumni
Black French sportspeople
Canadian emigrants to France